Cruz Rolando Palacios Castillo (born 3 May 1987) is a Honduran sprinter who specializes in the 100 metres and 200 metres. He was born in Sambo Creek, a traditional Garífuna village.  His personal best time is 10.22 seconds, achieved in July 2008 in Toluca.

He competed at the 2005 World Championships, the 2006 World Indoor Championships, the 2008 World Indoor Championships and the 2008 Olympic Games. In Beijing he finished fourth in his heat at the 100 metres with a time of 10.49 seconds, but was eliminated. At the 200 metres, he placed third in his heat behind Roman Smirnov and Walter Dix to qualify for the next round in a time of 20.81 seconds. In the second round he came to 20.87 seconds, which was the seventh time in his heat, not enough to advance to the next round.

He competed in the 200 m event at the 2016 Summer Olympics in Rio de Janeiro. He finished 7th in his heat with a time of 21.32 seconds and did not qualify for the semifinals. He was the flagbearer for Honduras during the Parade of Nations.

He set the 60 metres Honduran national record with a time of 6.62 seconds on 26 February 2009.

Personal bests
100 m: 10.22 s (wind: +0.3 m/s) –  Toluca, 18 July 2008
200 m: 20.40 s (wind: -0.9 m/s) –  Toluca, 22 July 2008
400 m: 47.64 s  –  Kingston, 12 February 2011

Major competitions record

References

External links
 

1987 births
Living people
People from Atlántida Department
Garifuna people
Honduran male sprinters
Athletes (track and field) at the 2008 Summer Olympics
Athletes (track and field) at the 2016 Summer Olympics
Athletes (track and field) at the 2011 Pan American Games
Olympic athletes of Honduras
Pan American Games competitors for Honduras
World Athletics Championships athletes for Honduras
Athletes (track and field) at the 2015 Pan American Games
Universiade medalists in athletics (track and field)
Central American and Caribbean Games gold medalists for Honduras
Central American Games gold medalists for Honduras
Central American Games medalists in athletics
Central American Games silver medalists for Honduras
Competitors at the 2006 Central American and Caribbean Games
Competitors at the 2010 Central American and Caribbean Games
Competitors at the 2014 Central American and Caribbean Games
Universiade medalists for Honduras
Central American and Caribbean Games medalists in athletics
Medalists at the 2009 Summer Universiade